Diarsia intermixta, also known as the orange peel moth, is a species of moth in the family Noctuidae. It is found from Queensland to Tasmania in Australia, as well as in New Zealand, and islands in the south Pacific.

The larva is coloured a mottled green or dark grey with flecks of black and yellow. The wingspan of the adult moth is about 30 mm.

The larvae feed on nettles, Sinapsis alba, Arctotheca calendula, Histiopteris incisa, Pteridium esculentum, and is considered a pest on Brassica rapa. Adults are on the wing in summer and autumn.

References

Diarsia
Moths of New Zealand
Moths of Australia
Moths described in 1852
Taxa named by Achille Guenée